Lockport City School District is the school district serving Lockport, New York.

Schools
Secondary schools:
 Lockport High School (Built in 1954) 
 Lockport High School West (Built in 1929)
 Aaron Mossell Junior High School (Built in 1938)

Primary schools:
 Emmet Belknap Intermediate School (Built in 1924)
 Anna Merritt Elementary School (Built in 1958)
 Charles Upson Elementary School (Built in 1954)
 George M. Southard Elementary School (Built in 1965)
 Roy B. Kelley Elementary School (Built in 1958)

References

External links
 

Education in Niagara County, New York
School districts in New York (state)